North Branch is a rural locality in the Southern Downs Region, Queensland, Australia. In the  North Branch had a population of 52 people.

Geography
North Branch has the following mountains:
  Mount Develin 
  Taylors Peak

History 
In the  North Branch had a population of 52 people.

References

Southern Downs Region
Localities in Queensland